Cesare Pogliano (born 8 January 1998) is an Italian footballer who plays as a defender for Lumezzane.

Club career

Chievo
He played for the Under-19 squad of Chievo in Campionato Primavera 1 from the 2015–16 season through to 2017–18. He made several bench appearances for Chievo's senior squad at the tail end of the 2016–17 Serie A season, but did not see playing time.

Loan to Reggina
On 9 July 2018, Pogliano joined Serie C club Reggina on a season-long loan. He made his professional debut in Serie C for Reggina on 18 September 2018 in a game against Trapani as an 88th-minute substitute for Alex Redolfi. On 23 December he played his first entire match for the team, a 2–0 home win over Vibonese.

Novara
On 16 July 2019, he signed a 3-year contract with Novara.

Cesena
On 7 September 2021, he signed a one-year deal with Cesena.

Career statistics

Club

References

1998 births
Living people
Sportspeople from Mantua
Footballers from Lombardy
Italian footballers
Association football defenders
A.C. ChievoVerona players
Reggina 1914 players
Novara F.C. players
Cesena F.C. players
F.C. Lumezzane V.G.Z. A.S.D. players
Serie C players
Serie D players